Amy Leach is an American non-fiction writer. She won a 2010 Whiting Award. She won a 2008 Rona Jaffe Foundation Writers' Award.

Life
She graduated from the University of Iowa with an MFA in creative nonfiction. 
She teaches literature at the University of St. Francis.

Her work has appeared in the Iowa Review, A Public Space, and the Wilson Quarterly.

Works

Books
Things That Are, Milkweed Editions, July 2012.

Articles

“Strangers”, A Public Space, Issue 27

"Sail On, My Little Honey Bee", A Public Space, Issue 7
"When Trees Dream of Being Trees", the daily pallette January 17, 2006

References

External links
Profile at The Whiting Foundation
Audio at Orion magazine

American non-fiction writers
University of Iowa alumni
Living people
Rona Jaffe Foundation Writers' Award winners
Year of birth missing (living people)